Francis Ridgley Cotton O.P. (September 19, 1895—September 25, 1960) was an American prelate of the Roman Catholic Church. He served as the first bishop of the new Diocese of Owensboro in Kentucky from 1938 to 1960.

Biography

Early life 
One of three children, Francis Cotton was born in Bardstown, Kentucky to Charles and Mary (née Moore) Cotton. After attending St. Meinrad Seminary in St. Meinrad, Indiana, he enrolled in St. Mary's Seminary in Baltimore, Maryland. Cotton then went in 1919 to Washington D.C. to enter the Sulpician Seminary at the Catholic University of America in Washington, D.C., finishing there in 1920.

Priesthood 
Cotton was ordained to the priesthood for the Order of Friars Preachers (Dominicans) by Archbishop John Timothy McNicholas on June 17, 1920.  After his ordination, Cotton completed his graduate studies at the Pontifical Athenaeum S. Apollinare in Rome. Following his return to Kentucky, he served as a curate at St. Joseph Proto-Cathedral Parish in Bardstown, St. Cecilia Parish in Louisville, Kentucky, and at St. Francis de Sales Parish  in Paducah, Kentucky (1922-1926). Cotton was appointed assistant chancellor in 1926, then chancellor in 1931.

Bishop of Owensboro 
On December 16, 1937, Cotton was appointed the first bishop of the newly erected Diocese of Owensboro by Pope Pius XI. He received his episcopal consecration on February 24, 1938, from Archbishop John A. Floersh, with Bishops Theodore H. Reverman and Moses E. Kiley serving as co-consecrators.  After his consecration, Cotton embarked on visits to the parishes in the new diocese. He brought the Catholic Students' Mission Crusade, a national organization for helping the poor, to the diocese.

In early 1940, Cotton began the collection of relief supplies for refugees from World War II in Europe.  By 1942, the diocese had collected over $1 million in supplies for distribution in Europe and China. In February 1943, Cotton held a synod in the diocese to set its laws and constitution.  Contemporary reports said that Cotton strictly enforced these rules in the diocese, but personally was a kind individual.

Francis Cotton died of a heart attack in Owensboro on September 25, 1965, at age 65.

References

Episcopal succession

1895 births
1960 deaths
People from Bardstown, Kentucky
People from Owensboro, Kentucky
Roman Catholic Diocese of Owensboro
St. Mary's Seminary and University alumni
Catholic University of America alumni
Religious leaders from Kentucky
Catholics from Kentucky
20th-century Roman Catholic bishops in the United States